Essence of Life, or Ayn al-Hayat, is a book of Hadith in Persian by Muhammad Baqir al-Majlisi (1616–1698 CE).

Contents
Chapter Names: 
 Profiles of the Benevolent Companions of the Prophet (A.S.)
 The Steps
 The Fundamentals
 The Benefits
 Refulgence or Rays of Light
 The Objectives
 The Maxims or Regulations
 The Traits - Qasail
 Lamaat: The Rays Of Light
 The Fruits
 The Stars
 The Yanabeeh or Streams
 The Status
 Masabeeh - The Lamps
 Invocations

See also
 List of Shi'a books
 Sayyid Murtadhā
 Sayyid Radhī
 Shaykh al-Mufīd
 Shaykh al-Tūsī
 Shaykh al-Sadūq
 Muhammad al-Kulaynī
 Allāmah Majlisī
 Shaykh al-Hur al-Āmilī

References

External links 
 Ayn al Hayat (English)

Shia hadith collections